Standford is a village in the East Hampshire district of Hampshire, England. It is in the civil parish of Headley.

References

External links

Villages in Hampshire